Ian James Botting (18 May 1922 – 9 July 1980) was a New Zealand rugby union player who represented both his country of birth and England. A wing three-quarter, Botting played for Otago at a provincial level, and was a member of the New Zealand national side, the All Blacks, on their 1949 tour of South Africa. He played nine matches for the All Blacks on that tour, but did not appear in any internationals. Following the tour, Botting became a student at the University of Oxford and in 1950 he made two test appearances for England in that year's Five Nations Championship.  He joined Leicester Tigers in 1951 and made his debut 1 December 1951 against Harlequins. He played in 38 matches for Leicester, scoring 15 tries, his final match was on Tuesday 7 April 1953 against Exeter.

An ordained Anglican minister, Botting was killed when he was knocked from his bicycle by a motor vehicle in Christchurch in 1980.

References

1922 births
1980 deaths
Rugby union players from Dunedin
People educated at Christ's College, Christchurch
New Zealand rugby union players
New Zealand international rugby union players
Otago rugby union players
University of Otago alumni
Alumni of the University of Oxford
England international rugby union players
Rugby union wings
Expatriate rugby union players in England
New Zealand expatriate rugby union players
New Zealand Anglican priests
Road incident deaths in New Zealand
New Zealand expatriate sportspeople in England
Leicester Tigers players
Cycling road incident deaths